Calamus elegans is a palm species in the genus Calamus.

References

External links 
 Calamus elegans at the International Plant Names Index (IPNI)

elegans
Plants described in 1907
Taxa named by Odoardo Beccari